Oleksandr Volodymyrovych Huskov (born 22 January 1994) is a professional Ukrainian football midfielder who last played for Livyi Bereh Kyiv .

He is the product of Youth Sportive School Znamianka and FC Ametyst Oleksandria sportive school and his first trainer was Serhiy Hrinkevych.

References

External links 

1994 births
Living people
People from Znamianka
Ukrainian footballers
FC Oleksandriya players
Association football midfielders
Ukrainian Premier League players
FC Poltava players
FC Bukovyna Chernivtsi players
FC Livyi Bereh Kyiv players
Ukrainian First League players
Sportspeople from Kirovohrad Oblast